Carlos Torres Garcés (born 15 August 1951) is an Ecuadorian footballer. He played in 16 matches for the Ecuador national football team from 1976 to 1985. He was also part of Ecuador's squad for the 1979 Copa América tournament.

References

External links
 
 

1951 births
Living people
Ecuadorian footballers
Ecuador international footballers
Association football midfielders
Ecuadorian expatriate footballers
Ecuadorian expatriate sportspeople in Mexico
Expatriate footballers in Mexico
Sportspeople from Esmeraldas, Ecuador
9 de Octubre F.C. managers